Rembrandt is a 1936 British biographical film made by London Film Productions of the life of 17th-century Dutch painter Rembrandt van Rijn. The film was produced and directed by Alexander Korda from a screenplay by June Head and Lajos Bíró based on a story by Carl Zuckmayer. The music score was by Geoffrey Toye and the cinematography by Georges Périnal.

Plot

Cast
 Charles Laughton as Rembrandt van Rijn
 Gertrude Lawrence as Geertje Dircx
 Elsa Lanchester as Hendrickje Stoffels
 Edward Chapman as Carel Fabritius
 Walter Hudd as Frans Banning Cocq
 Roger Livesey as Beggar Saul
 John Bryning as Titus van Rijn
 Sam Livesey as Auctioneer
 Herbert Lomas as Gerrit van Rijn
 Allan Jeayes as Dr. Tulp
 John Clements as Govert Flinck
 Raymond Huntley as Ludwick
 Abraham Sofaer as Dr. Menasseh
 Laurence Hanray as Heertsbeeke
 Austin Trevor as Marquis de Grand-Coeur
 Edmund Willard as Van Zeeland
 Henry Hewitt as Jan Six
 Marius Goring as Baron Leivens (uncredited)
 Wilfrid Hyde-White as Civil Guardsman (uncredited)  
 Alexander Knox as Ludwick's Assistant (uncredited) 
 Hay Petrie as Jeweller (uncredited)

Production
Alexander Korda had previously worked with Laughton on The Private Life of Henry VIII— a hit “on both sides of the Atlantic”—and wanted to re-create that success.

In an article on TCM.com, Seattle Times critic Sean Axmaker describes the detailed preparations for the film, which included Korda and Laughton's repeated trips to Holland and Laughton's taking up painting and growing a mustache. “There were problems on the set, notably a clash with stage legend Gertrude Lawrence... She was quite the raconteur on set, entertaining the cast and crew, and especially Korda, with gossip and ribald stories while Laughton tried to focus on his part. Laughton had soundproof screens put around the set to keep the chatter and bustle down, but Korda's perceived neglect of Laughton in favor of Lawrence led to a rift between the actor and the director that was never repaired.”

The AFI Catalog offers more detail on the production, including Lawrence's behavior, as well as observations and quotes from Lanchester and Laughton, too numerous to paraphrase here.

Laughton's wife, Elsa Lanchester plays Hendrickje, Rembrandt's maid and model, who becomes his lover and bears his daughter. Lanchester composed the music and lyrics for  “Hendrickje's Theme”.

Critical reception
In a 3 December 1936 review in The New York Times, B.R.Crisler, recommended the picture “in the strongest terms.”: "Charles Laughton and Alexander Korda have produced a great, and rich, and glowing motion picture in Rembrandt... a picture signed all over with distinction, like one of the master's own canvases... the noblest subject and the best likeness—so far, at any rate—in Mr. Laughton's inspired gallery of historical portraits”. Inspired “to raise ... perhaps undignified cheers,” the author pointed to the film's “courageous indifference to ‘romance,’ in the cheap Hollywood sense, its surprising, rather foreign awareness of the facts of life, and its resolute hewing to a line of individual integrity and character”.

In her 15 March 1937, “Shots and Angles” column in Maclean's, Ann Ross  recommended the “dignified, informative and beautifully acted picture.”

Writing for The Spectator in 1936, Graham Greene gave the film a poor review, describing it as "a series of unrelated tableaux". Greene found that "the film is ruined by lack of story ['line'] and continuity [...] [which is the] drive of a well-constructed plot". Greene gave some praise for the acting of Laughton and Lanchester, but condemned the  direction stating "I have called the film reverent, but pompous, I fear, would be nearer the mark."

Time Out writes that although the film was "Less successful at the time than the earlier Private Life of Henry VIII, (it is) a far better film, thanks to a subtle, touching performance from Laughton as the ageing painter...Surprisingly sombre, it lacks a tight plot, but appeals through its vivid characterisation, superb Vincent Korda sets, and Georges Périnal's lovely camerawork."

In June 2018, The British Film Institute praised Rembrandt as “one of the most beautiful period films of its time. Laughton... is on fine form... the cinematography by Georges Périnal elegantly captures not just the painter’s life and times but also replicates the immersive, shadowy textures of his canvasses. One memorable scene, in which the widowed Rembrandt’s libido is reawakened by the sight of his maid walking up to her bedroom, is a tour de force of florid expressionism.”

Leonard Maltin gives 3.5 out of 4 stars to this “Handsome bio of Dutch painter, full of visual tableaux and sparked by Laughton's excellent performance.”

In 2007, Dennis Schwartz gave the film an A-minus: “(This) is a superior film and Korda has nothing to be ashamed of in the way he filmed it without the usual Hollywood action scenes. It features a marvelously spirited and subtle performance by Charles Laughton...  Though the film only has a slight plot and there’s not much dramatic tension, it has a grand visual style.”

Rotten Tomatoes lists a 75% rating, based on 8 reviews, for an average of 7.1/10.

In popular culture
The film is mentioned in Len Deighton's 1970 novel Bomber, which portrays an RAF night bombing raid on a German town in 1943. At the RAF bomber station at Warley Fen, as the aircrew prepare for take-off in the early evening, off-duty ground crew attend a screening of Rembrandt at the station cinema. The novel mentions that the turnout is so many, extra chairs are brought in from another building and latecomers sit in the aisles.

References

Bibliography
 Jerry Vermilye The Great British Films, Citadel Press, 1978, pp 32–35

External links
  (also source for cast information)
 
 
 
 
 

1936 films
1930s historical films
Films about Rembrandt
British black-and-white films
British biographical films
British historical films
Films directed by Alexander Korda
Films based on works by Carl Zuckmayer
Films set in the 1640s
Films set in the 1650s
Films set in the 1660s
Films set in Amsterdam
Films produced by Alexander Korda
London Films films
1930s biographical films
1930s English-language films
1930s British films